The 2014 Middle Tennessee Blue Raiders football team represented Middle Tennessee State University as a member of the East Division of  Conference USA (C-USA) during the 2014 NCAA Division I FBS football season. Led by ninth-year head coach Rick Stockstill, the Blue Raiders compiled an overall record of 6–6 with a mark of 5–3 in conference play, placing second in C-USA's East Division. Despite being bowl eligible, the team was not invited to a bowl game. Middle Tennessee played home games at Johnny "Red" Floyd Stadium in Murfreesboro, Tennessee.

Schedule

Game summaries

Savannah State

Minnesota

WKU

Memphis

Old Dominion

Southern Miss

Marshall

UAB

BYU

FIU

Florida Atlantic

UTEP

References

Middle Tennessee
Middle Tennessee Blue Raiders football seasons
Middle Tennessee Blue Raiders football